Frillesås is a locality situated in Kungsbacka Municipality, Halland County, Sweden, with 2,044 inhabitants in 2010. Frillesås BK is a bandy club.

References 

Populated places in Halland County
Populated places in Kungsbacka Municipality